Eudemis is a genus of moths belonging to the subfamily Olethreutinae of the family Tortricidae.

Species
Eudemis brevisetosa Oku, 2005
Eudemis centritis (Meyrick, 1912)
Eudemis gyrotis (Meyrick, 1909)
Eudemis lucina Liu & Bai, 1982
Eudemis polychroma Diakonoff, 1981
Eudemis porphyrana (Hubner, [1796-1799])
Eudemis profundana ([Denis & Schiffermuller], 1775)

See also
List of Tortricidae genera

References

External links
tortricidae.com

Olethreutini
Tortricidae genera
Taxa named by Jacob Hübner